Dhoom 2 (trans. Blast 2) is a 2006 Indian Hindi-language action thriller film directed by Sanjay Gadhvi and written by Vijay Krishna Acharya, based on a story by producer Aditya Chopra, who backed the film at an estimated budget of  under the banner Yash Raj Films. The film stars Hrithik Roshan, Abhishek Bachchan, Aishwarya Rai Bachchan, Bipasha Basu and Uday Chopra. Dhoom 2 was shot primarily in India, Durban and Rio de Janeiro, becoming the first major Hindi film to be shot in Brazil. It is a sequel to the 2004 film Dhoom and is the second installment in the Dhoom series. Abhishek Bachchan and Uday Chopra reprise their roles as buddy cops Jai Dixit and Ali Khan, respectively. Yash Raj Films also partenered with Pepe Jeans and Coca-Cola for the film's promotional tie-ups.

It became the highest grossing Hindi film of 2006 and was the highest-grossing Hindi film of all time as well at the time of its release. It also is the seventh highest-grossing Bollywood film in overseas markets. It received positive reviews from critics upon release, with praise for its action sequences, soundtrack, cinematography and cast performances (particularly Roshan), but criticism directed towards its pacing and writing.

At the 52nd Filmfare Awards, Dhoom 2 received 8 nominations, including Best Film, Best Director (Gadhvi) and Best Actress (Rai), and won Best Actor (Roshan).

The film also proved to be controversial post release, as there was an appeal by the Mumbai city police commissioner to censor the fast-paced rash driving scenes due to fears that it would inspire Indian youths to ride their motorcycles rashly, resulting in an increase in the number of road accidents. A sequel titled Dhoom 3 was released on 20 December 2013, which also went on to become the twelfth-highest-grossing Hindi film to date, and the highest-grossing Hindi film of all time as well at the time of its release.

Plot
In the Namib Desert. Mr. A skydives onto a train that is carrying the Queen Elizabeth II, where he steals her crown by disguising himself as the Queen, beats her guards easily, and escapes. ACP Jai Dixit and the newly promoted SI Ali Akbar Khan are introduced to Shonali Bose, a special officer assigned to investigate Mr. A's case, who also happens to be Jai's former classmate. After the initial investigation, Jai analyses the underlying trend in Mr. A's heists and concludes that the theft will follow in one of two famous Mumbai city museums. When Jai realizes that the artifact in the museum he is guarding happens to be imperfect, he rushes to the other museum, where a disguised Mr. A steals a rare diamond and escapes.

While he is about to catch a flight, Mr. A sees on the TV that someone else claiming to be himself, challenges the cops by saying that he will steal an ancient warrior sword. In response, Jai, Bose, and Khan enforce a strict guard at the location of the sword. At night, Mr. A meets the real thief, the one who made the claim on TV, in the room that holds the sword. The police are alerted, but they manage to steal the sword, Shonali is injured in the confrontation, and they manage to escape. The impersonator turns out to be Sunehri, a woman who idolises Mr. A; Sunehri convinces Mr. A to form an alliance, but he turns her down. After a game of basketball between the two, Mr. A finally agrees to work together.

In Rio de Janeiro, Mr. A and Sunehri plan their next heist. As Jai's analysis has named Rio the location of Mr. A's next heist, Jai and Ali travel to the city. There they meet Monali, Shonali's twin sister, who only speaks English, and Ali immediately falls for her. Later, Sunehri meets with Jai to discuss how things are going between her and Mr. A, revealing that they are working together, and Jai is using her by ensuring her freedom from prison. To get close to Mr. A and find out what his next plan is, they can catch and arrest him, but Sunehri begins to have her doubts. Mr. A and Sunehri fall in love with each other, and Mr. An unveils his real identity Aryan Singh to her. However, during the Rio Carnival, disguised as one of the entertainers, Aryan sees Sunehri and Jai together and realizes that Sunehri has been working undercover for Jai.

The next day, Aryan forces Sunehri to play a game of Russian roulette. Sunehri cries and refuses to shoot him, but Aryan forces her to play. After six attempted shots, neither is killed, because Aryan never loaded the gun. Sunehri admits she betrayed Aryan and confesses her love for him. In their final heist, Aryan and Sunehri successfully steal some early Lydian coins while disguised as performing dwarfs. With the heist successfully pulled off, Jai realises that he has been betrayed, and she called him on the phone to confirm that she wants to stay with Aryan and does not wish to remain allied with Jai, forcing Jai and Ali to go after them. After the chase, all of them end up on the top of a waterfall, where Ali catches Sunehri. Sunehri, despite conveying her feelings for Aryan, shoots him. Aryan falls from the waterfall, after which Jai allows Sunehri to go free.

Six months later, it is revealed that Aryan survived and has opened a restaurant in the Fiji islands with Sunehri. Jai meets Aryan and Sunehri at the restaurant and states that despite their crimes, he does not wish to imprison the couple. Aryan tells him where all the stolen artefacts can be found via a digital watch. Jai is aware of the couple's feelings towards each other and releases them with a warning against returning to their life of crime and sparing their lives. After leaving, Jai receives a phone call, and informs Ali that they should be heading back to India for their next case.

Cast
 Hrithik Roshan  Aryan Singh ("Mr. A")  
 Roshan also briefly plays Elizabeth II
 Abhishek Bachchan as ACP Jai Dixit
 Aishwarya Rai  Sunheri
 Bipasha Basu  ACP Shonali Bose and Monali Bose
 Uday Chopra  Sub-Inspector Ali Akbar Fateh Khan
 Rimi Sen  Sweety Dixit
 Yusuf Hussain  Mumbai Police Commissioner
 Mohit Chauhan  Chief Security Guard

Production

Development
The Dhoom franchise began with the release of Dhoom in 2004. The film became a commercial box office hit and received positive reviews from audiences, but mixed-to-negative reviews from critics. As a result, producer Yash Chopra announced plans for a sequel, titled Dhoom 2 – Back in Action. John Abraham, portrayer of Kabir Sharma, the villain of the predecessor, was eliminated from the sequel because Chopra did not want Dhoom 2 to repeat the stories featured in its predecessor. Instead, Hrithik Roshan and Aishwarya Rai were introduced into the franchise as the sequel's main villains. Rai's character was summarized as Catwoman, a female fictional comic book femme fatale or anti-hero. Rai stated, "All I can tell you is it would be nothing like anything you've seen me do before." Producer Aditya Chopra told Rai to lose weight after she gained it for her role in Bride & Prejudice (2004). Yash Chopra stated, "But yes, the role does require Rai to convey oodles of sensuality. She has asked for a couple of months to get into shape. We (at Yash Raj Films) are very clear about every character in every script and what's required of the actors. Before Dhoom, Esha Deol was specifically briefed about the look and the attitude she needed to cultivate. She readily agreed, and look at what Dhoom did to her career!" Roshan also lost 5 kg for his role at Aditya Chopra's request. With the exception of Abraham and Deol, all of the other main actors in Dhoom reprised their roles for Dhoom 2.

Filming
Dhoom 2 was filmed in Mumbai (India), Namibia, Durban (South Africa), and Rio de Janeiro (Brazil), making it the first Bollywood movie to be shot in Brazil. To ensure the sequel would be different from the original, which became famous for its brash motorcycle stunts, director Sanjay Gadhvi included very few motorcycles in Dhoom 2. Nonetheless, Roshan's role required him to perform several dangerous stunts involving activities such as roller-blading, sand boarding and snow-boarding.

Dhoom 2 made extensive use of visual effects, which were filmed at Yash Raj Studios. While shooting at Yash Raj Studios, the film suffered from a flood that destroyed the studio sets and delayed production. Fight and action sequences were storyboarded before being shown to Gadhvi and Allan Amin, who would make changes. The scenes were then sketched, given "proper shot-list[s]", and shared with Tata Elxsi, who oversaw the pre-visualization of the sequences. Several scenes were filmed with the use of green screen and computer-generated imagery. For example, the stunts Roshan performed on a train in the Namib Desert used green screen; after Roshan recorded the stunts on a set, Gadhvi traveled to the desert to film the background. Other stunts were performed by stuntmen whose faces were later digitally exchanged with the actors'.

The bullet effects and Roshan's gadgets and the mechanical arm were also computer-generated. The scene involving Bachchan coming out of a lake using a jet ski was created using a green screen. The stunt came out at 90 degrees, but Gadhvi wanted a 60 degrees jump. So, it was shot with a Super 35, and hence the angle could be changed. Gadhvi discussed the use of technology in an interview:

Music

The soundtrack of Dhoom 2 was recorded at YRF Studios. The music was composed by Pritam with background score by Salim–Sulaiman. The lyrics were penned by Sameer except "Dhoom Again" by Asif Ali Beg and "Crazy Kiya Re — Remix" was remixed by Bunty Rajput. Although most of the song's lyrics are primarily written in Hindi with some English, "Dhoom Again" is almost entirely in English. The soundtrack received mixed reviews from critics but high praise from the audience. It became the best-selling Bollywood soundtrack of the year. The film's soundtrack is the first in Indian cinema to be released in DVD-Audio in addition to other audio formats. The tracks have been mixed in London in 5.1 Surround Sound.

Release

Dhoom 2 was released on 24 November 2006 in India, where it received the widest release in Indian cinema history at the time with over 1800 prints, including 250 digital copies. Some locations raised ticket prices for the film.  It was simultaneously dubbed and released in Tamil and Telugu languages. Singer Vijay Prakash dubbed for Abhishek Bachchan in Tamil.

Marketing

Dhoom 2s teaser trailer was released with Kabhi Alvida Naa Kehna which released on 11 August 2006.

It was promoted with several tie-ins. Coca-Cola promoted the film as "Coke Uthale, Dhoom Machale". India's video game producing company FXLabs developed a game based on the film. Pepe Jeans sold Dhoom 2-related garments, including shirts, jeans, bandannas, caps, and metal accessories. Chetan Shah, the country head of Pepe Jeans London, stated – "Pepe Jeans is tremendously excited to be associated with the most awaited movie of the year Dhoom:2. The incredible ensemble cast of Hrithik Roshan, Abhishek Bachchan, Aishwarya Rai, Bipasha Basu and Uday Chopra and the exciting and explosive content of the film encapsulates everything that the Pepe Jeans brand stands for - young, cool, trendy, hip, fashionable and innovative. While promoting Dhoom 2, Roshan admitted feeling foolish over his past statements about his co-star Rai being a "pretty face with no talent" after they worked together for the first time in Dhoom 2. The duo were again cast opposite each other in Jodhaa Akbar (2008) and Guzaarish (2010), and thus went on to become one of the most-loved on-screen pairs of Bollywood.

Legal issues
The city of Mumbai's police commissioner called for censoring of the fast-paced rash driving scenes in the film due to fears that it would inspire Indian youths to ride their motorcycles rashly, resulting in an increase in the number of road accidents. Unlike the original, the robberies depicted in Dhoom 2 were not inspired by any real-life crimes. Dhoom 2, allegedly inspired the robbery of a man by his nephew, who wore clothing similar to Hrithik's in the film while committing the crime.

Box office
It is currently the 13th highest-grossing film in India (unadjusted for inflation).

Dhoom 2 grossed US$979,000 in North America in 63 theatres over its three-day opening weekend ($1.3 million over four days), becoming the third largest opening weekend for a Bollywood film in North America. Overall, it was the seventeenth ranked film at the American box office. Box Office Mojo reports it earned a total of $2,643,586 inside the United States and a total of $29,752,841 in other countries, including India. In Dubai, it achieved the highest first day opening for a Bollywood film.

Dhoom 2 ranked sixth among the highest-grossing opening weekends for international films at the United Kingdom box office with a gross (average per screen) of £8,151. At the Australian box office, it had the twelfth highest opening and collected approximately A$176,462. It grossed approximately NZ $51,453 on five screens in New Zealand. Dhoom 2 grossed over US$8,750,000 total in the overseas markets.

Reception

India
In India, the film received positive reviews from critics. Taran Adarsh of Bollywood Hungama gave 4.5 out of 5 stars, reporting "On the whole, Dhoom 2 is a winner all the way. For Yash Raj Films, who've not only produced but also distributed the film, Dhoom 2 should emerge as one of the biggest hits of their career." Rajesh Karkera of Rediff gave it 3.5 stars out of 5, calling it "A complete roller-coaster ride which left me completely enthralled and exhausted. Sure, there are faults when you stop to think rationally. But that does not stop you from being dazzled by the film." Rajeev Masand of CNN-IBN gave it a 3 star rating, saying that Dhoom 2 is without doubt better than its predecessor, and that Roshan is the heart and soul of the film. Vijay Venkataramanan of Planet Bollywood gave it 7 out of 10 stars; despite having criticized the film's plot and Rai's performance, he still called it a good adrenaline-pumping entertainer.

International
Review aggregator Rotten Tomatoes reported 92% of 13 critics were positive and gave it a "fresh" certificate. Variety commented, "Loaded with enough attitude, Bollywood star-power and buff bodies to stop a speeding train, Dhoom 2 has been doing humongous biz since its 24 November worldwide opening, and provides adequate proof that Yash Raj Films is good for more than just family-oriented romantic comedy-dramas."

Rachel Saltz of The New York Times reviewed, "The pleasure principle is palpable in the giddy, slick Dhoom 2, a satisfying example of the new, thoroughly modern Bollywood. It may represent the new-fangled Bollywood, but old-fashioned star power is what animates and elevates it above its occasional narrative flaws and longueurs." Film Journal Internationals Ethan Alter said, "Dhoom 2 has all of the benefits of a big-budget Bollywood production – big-name stars, exotic locales, well-produced musical numbers and elaborate (by Bollywood standards, anyway) action sequences. It makes no lasting contributions to world cinema, but if 2.5 hours of disposable entertainment are all you're after, you could do far worse." L.A. Weeklys David Chute stated the film was, "A movie meal as satisfying as this one can make you feel that nothing else matters." Jaspreet Pandohar of the BBC gave it a 2-star rating, writing "By roping in acclaimed action director Alan Amin to take care of the thrills and spills, you'd expect Gadhvi to have spent time crafting out a sophisticated storyline instead of simply sending his cast on a cat-and-mouse chase around the globe. It's only Roshan's charismatic performance as the criminal mastermind, and the sizzling chemistry he shares with Rai's sassy cohort, that rescues this adventure from becoming an elongated tourism commercial." Manish Gajjar, Bollywood correspondent for BBC Shropshire said, "With its high-powered action sequences matching Hollywood standards, Dhoom 2 is a winner all the way at the box office!"

Accolades
Dhoom 2 was nominated for several awards that year, but only picked up a few of the major ones. At the 52nd Filmfare Awards, Roshan won Best Actor, out of 8 total nominations for the film. At the 8th IIFA Awards, the film won for Best Costume Design and Best Makeup. At the 2007 Stardust Awards, Rai won Star of the Year – Female and Gadhvi won the Hottest Young Filmmaker.

 52nd Filmfare Awards:

Won
 Best Actor – Hrithik Roshan

Nominated
 Best Film – Yash Chopra
 Best Director – Sanjay Gadhvi
 Best Actress – Aishwarya Rai
 Best Music Director – Pritam
 Best Background Score – Salim–Sulaiman
 Best Special Effects – Tata Elxsi
 Best Action – Allan Amin

2007 MTV India Style Awards:

At the 2007 MTV India Style Awards, Dhoom 2 swept nearly all of the film awards, winning the following:
 Most Stylish Film – Dhoom 2
 Most Stylish Actor – Male – Hrithik Roshan
 Most Stylish Actor – Female – Aishwarya Rai
 Most Stylish New Look – Hrithik Roshan
 Most Stylish Body – Hrithik Roshan
 Most Stylish Couple – Hrithik Roshan & Aishwarya Rai
 Most Stylish Song in A Film – Shiamak Davar (choreographer)
 Most Stylish Bollywood Designer – Anaita Shroff Adajania

Home media
Dhoom 2 was released in DVD format in February 2007. It was distributed by Yash Raj Films in all regions as a two-disc set and for region 1 as a single-disc set. It was released on Blu-ray in December 2009.

Sequel

See also 
 List of highest-grossing Bollywood films
 List of Bollywood films of 2006

References

External links
 
 
 
 
 
 
 Dhoom 2 at Yahoo!
 Dhoom 2 at Bollywood Hungama
 Dhoom 2 at Rediff.com

2006 films
2000s Hindi-language films
2000s heist films
2006 action thriller films
Indian action thriller films
Indian heist films
Indian sequel films
Films set in Brazil
Films shot in Rio de Janeiro (city)
Films shot in India
Films shot in KwaZulu-Natal
Films shot in Namibia
Films set in Mumbai
Films shot in Mumbai
Films set in Rio de Janeiro (city)
Films directed by Sanjay Gadhvi
Yash Raj Films films
Films set on beaches
Films featuring songs by Pritam
Fictional portrayals of the Maharashtra Police
Cultural depictions of Elizabeth II